The tournament in Sobota was a new addition to the ITF Women's Circuit.

The fourth seeds Barbora Krejčíková and Aleksandra Krunić won the tournament, defeating third seeds Anastasiya Vasylyeva and Maryna Zanevska in the final, 3–6, 6–0, [10–6].

Seeds

Draw

References 
 Draw

Powiat Poznanski Open - Doubles
WSG Open